Johnny Edward Jenkins (March 5, 1939 – June 26, 2006) was an American left-handed blues guitarist, who helped launch the career of Otis Redding. His flamboyant style of guitar playing also influenced Jimi Hendrix.

Career
In the 1960s Jenkins was the leader of the Pinetoppers, who employed a young Otis Redding as singer. As Jenkins did not have a driver's license, Redding also served as his personal driver. During a recording session in 1962 organized by the band's manager, Phil Walden, Jenkins left forty minutes of studio time unused. Redding used this time to record a ballad, "These Arms of Mine", on which Jenkins played guitar. Scott Freeman, in his biography of Redding, Otis!: The Otis Redding Story, gives several accounts of that chaotic day at Stax Records. In 1964, Jenkins released an instrumental single, "Spunky" (Volt V-122).

With Phil Walden concentrating on Redding's flourishing career, Jenkins was sidelined, and it was not until after Redding's death in 1967 that Walden again concentrated on Jenkins's career. In 1970, Jenkins released the album Ton-Ton Macoute!. The opening track, a cover of Dr. John's "I Walk on Guilded Splinters", has been sampled by numerous musicians, including Beck (Loser), and Oasis (Go Let It Out). Several tracks on Ton-Ton Macoute! featured Duane Allman on guitar and dobro.

With Walden again becoming involved in other projects, Jenkins became disillusioned with the music industry and did nothing of note until 1996. By then Walden had persuaded him to make a comeback, and he released the album Blessed Blues, recorded with Chuck Leavell. Two further albums followed: Handle with Care and All in Good Time.

Death 

Jenkins died from a stroke in June 2006 in the same town where he was born: Macon, Georgia. He was 67.

Induction 

Jenkins was inducted into the Georgia Music Hall of Fame in 2012.

Discography

Solo
 Ton-Ton Macoute! (1970)
 Blessed Blues (1996)
 Handle With Care (2001)
 All in Good Time (2005)

With Otis Redding
 Pain in My Heart (Atco Records, 1964)
 The Great Otis Redding Sings Soul Ballads (Atco Records, 1965)

References

External links
Johnny Jenkins at Amazon
Washington Post, "Johnny Jenkins, aided Otis Redding" June 29, 2006 retrieved July 1, 2006

1939 births
2006 deaths
American blues guitarists
American male guitarists
Musicians from Macon, Georgia
Capricorn Records artists
20th-century American guitarists
Guitarists from Georgia (U.S. state)
20th-century American male musicians